The 1971 Trans-AMA motocross series was the second annual international series established by the American Motorcyclist Association as a pilot event to help establish motocross in the United States. The motocross series was an invitational based on a 500cc engine displacement formula, run on American tracks featuring the top riders from the F.I.M. world championship against the top American riders.

Suzuki factory rider Sylvain Geboers claimed the championship with three overall victories. German Maico rider, Adolf Weil scored two overall victories and claimed second place in the championship, with Swedish Husqvarna pilot Torlief Hansen taking third place. The Suzuki team mates of Joel Robert and Roger De Coster didn't join the event until the fifth race of the series, but made an impact with De Coster posting three overall victories with Robert adding one more. As a result of his being the highest placed American rider at fourteenth overall, Mark Blackwell, was crowned the American motocross national champion, clinching the title by one point over Brad Lackey.

1971 Trans-AMA final standings

1971 Trans-AMA Round 1 
Sep. 19, 1971, Carlsbad, California

1971 Trans-AMA Round 2 
Sep. 26, 1971, Boise, Idaho

1971 Trans-AMA Round 3 
Oct. 3, 1971, Elkhorn, Wisconsin

1971 Trans-AMA Round 4 
Oct. 10, 1971, Unadilla, New York

1971 Trans-AMA Round 5 
Oct. 24, 1971, Delta, Ohio

1971 Trans-AMA Round 6 
Oct. 31, 1971, Orlando, Florida

1971 Trans-AMA Round 7 
Nov. 7, 1971, St. Peters, Missouri

1971 Trans-AMA Round 8 
Nov. 14, 1971, Tulsa, Oklahoma

1971 Trans-AMA Round 9 
Nov. 21, 1971, Puyallup, Washington

1971 Trans-AMA Round 10 
Nov. 28, 1971, Livermore, California

1971 Trans-AMA Round 11 
Dec. 5, 1971, Saddleback Park, California

External links
 American Motorcyclist, Dec 1971, Vol. 25, No. 12, ISSN 0277-9358
 American Motorcyclist, January 1972, Vol. 26, No. 1, ISSN 0277-9358

References

Trans-AMA
Trans-AMA
Trans-AMA motocross series
AMA Motocross Championship Season
Trans-AMA